"Pilgrim" is a song by Danish singer-songwriter MØ. The song was released as a digital download in Denmark on 15 March 2013 through Chess Club and RCA Victor as the second single from her debut studio album No Mythologies to Follow (2014). The song was featured as a score in the Italian version of an advertisement for Armani's fragrance Acqua di Gioia. The song has peaked at number 11 on the Danish Singles Chart.

MSMR Remix
The official video for the MS MR remix of the song was directed by Esben Weile Kjær. 
MØ has performed the song live several times. Performances include Glastonbury Festival, for Vogue, at P3 Guld Denmark 2013, and for PerezHilton.com.

Track listing

Charts

Certifications

Release history

References

MØ songs
2013 songs
2013 singles
Songs written by MØ
Songs written by Ronni Vindahl